Angela Pitt (born 1986) is a Canadian politician who was elected in the 2015 Alberta general election to the Legislative Assembly of Alberta representing the electoral district of Airdrie. She was elected under the banner of the Wildrose Party, which then merged with the Progressive Conservative Party to form the United Conservative Party (UCP) in July 2017. She serves as the UCP Deputy House Leader. On June 20, 2018, Angela Pitt won the UCP nomination for the riding of Airdrie-East with 71% of the vote, contested by sports broadcaster Roger Millions. April 16, 2019, Pitt was re-elected in the 2019 Alberta general election, representing the Airdrie-East riding under the United Conservative Party.

Deputy Speaker and Chair of Committees 
On May 21, 2019, Pitt was chosen by her peers to serve as Deputy Speaker and Chair of Committees in the 30th Alberta Legislature.

Personal life 
Angela Pitt is married and has two children. She holds a business administration diploma with a major in marketing from the Southern Alberta Institute of Technology (SAIT). Pitt was a small business owner and managed a special events company before her life in politics. She eventually sold her business to focus primarily on her political career.

Controversies 
Pitt's association with the Wildrose Party in the Airdrie community resulted in the claim that she may have been responsible for transferring a total of $16,000 from the Wildrose Party constituency association to a political action committee referred to as the Alberta Fund. This issue was resolved after Pitt revealed that one of the people who brought this claim against her was her opponent's campaign manager and Elections Alberta verified that transferring funds from constituency associations to a registered third party is not against the law.

Pitt has been a vocal critic of the United Conservative Party government response to COVID-19, joining 16 other members of the legislature in a letter denouncing COVID-19 restrictions in April 2021, and joined the "End the Lockdowns" national caucus of elected officials. In a video conference for the "Free Alberta Strategy" on September 28, 2021, Pitt stated she had "no confidence" in Premier Jason Kenney, the statement came from growing dissatisfaction with the provincial government's response to COVID-19.

Electoral history

2019 general election

2015 general election

External links

References

1980s births
Living people
People from Airdrie, Alberta
Wildrose Party MLAs
Women MLAs in Alberta
21st-century Canadian politicians
21st-century Canadian women politicians
United Conservative Party MLAs